The commune of Giteranyi is a commune of Muyinga Province in northeastern Burundi. The capital lies at Giteranyi.

References

Communes of Burundi
Muyinga Province